The second constituency for French residents overseas (French: Deuxième circonscription des Français établis hors de France) is one of eleven constituencies representing French citizens living abroad. It was created by the 2010 redistricting of French legislative constituencies and elects, since 2012, one representative to the National Assembly.

It represents all French citizens living abroad in Mexico, the Caribbean (except Puerto Rico), South America and Central America. It is the least populous constituency of its kind, containing 89,012 registered French voters as of 2022.

Area
It covers all French citizens living in Antigua and Barbuda, Argentina, the Bahamas, Barbados, Belize, Bolivia, Brazil, Chile, Colombia, Costa Rica, Cuba, Dominica, the Dominican Republic, Ecuador, El Salvador, Grenada, Guatemala, Guyana, Haiti, Honduras, Jamaica, Mexico, Nicaragua, Panama, Paraguay, Peru, Saint Kitts and Nevis, Saint Lucia, Saint Vincent and the Grenadines, Suriname, Trinidad and Tobago, Uruguay, and Venezuela. Thus it covers every country in the Americas – other than Canada and the United States, which together constitute the First constituency. Nor does it include the French overseas departments and territories in the Americas, which are part of France and form constituencies of their own: Saint-Pierre-et-Miquelon (one constituency), Guadeloupe (four), Martinique (four) and French Guiana (two).

It is the least populous constituency of its kind, as it contained, as of New Year's Day 2011, 92,633 registered French voters.

This constituency elected its first ever representative at the 2012 French legislative election.

Deputies

National Assembly elections

2023 by-election 
The election was annulled by the Constitutional Council on January 20th, 2023, due to a malfunction in the organization of the online ballot. The election will take place on 1st and 15th April.

2022 

 
 
 
 
|-
| colspan="8" bgcolor="#E9E9E9"|
|-

2017

|- style="background-color:#E9E9E9;text-align:center;"
! colspan="2" rowspan="2" style="text-align:left;" | Candidate
! rowspan="2" colspan="2" style="text-align:left;" | Party
! colspan="2" | 1st round
! colspan="2" | 2nd round
|- style="background-color:#E9E9E9;text-align:center;"
! width="75" | Votes
! width="30" | %
! width="75" | Votes
! width="30" | %
|-
| style="background-color:" |
| style="text-align:left;" | Paula Forteza
| style="text-align:left;" | La Republique En Marche!
| REM
| 
| 43.17%
| 
| 60.92%
|-
| style="background-color:" |
| style="text-align:left;" | Sergio Coronado
| style="text-align:left;" | Europe Ecology – The Greens-FI-PP
| EELV
| 
| 23.61%
| 
| 39.08%
|-
| style="background-color:" |
| style="text-align:left;" | Pascal Drouhaud
| style="text-align:left;" | The Republicans
| LR
| 
| 11.18%
| colspan=2 rowspan=13 style="background-color:#E9E9E9;"|
|-
| style="background-color:" |
| style="text-align:left;" | Charles-Henry Chenut
| style="text-align:left;" | Union of Democrats and Independents
| UDI
| 
| 8.28%
|-
| style="background-color:" |
| style="text-align:left;" | Thierry Rignol
| style="text-align:left;" | Miscellaneous right
| DVD
| 
| 4.45%
|-
| style="background-color:" |
| style="text-align:left;" | Jean-Marc Millet
| style="text-align:left;" | National Front
| FN
| 
| 2.53%
|-
| style="background-color:" |
| style="text-align:left;" | Florence Baillon
| style="text-align:left;" | Socialist Party
| PS
| 
| 2.37%
|-
| style="background-color:" |
| style="text-align:left;" | Martin Biurrun
| style="text-align:left;" | Miscellaneous right
| DVD
| 
| 1.39%
|-
| style="background-color:" |
| style="text-align:left;" | Jacques Werckmann
| style="text-align:left;" | Independent Ecological Movement
| MEI
| 
| 0.95%
|-
| style="background-color:#0b7d86" |
| align="left" | Jean-Philippe Noël
| align="left" | Popular Republican Union
| UPR
| 
| 0.90%
|-
| style="background-color:" |
| align="left" | Lawrence Perea
| align="left" | Communist Party
| PCF
| 
| 0.50%
|-
| style="background-color:" |
| align="left" | Hai-Dang Ha-Thuc
| colspan=2 align="left" | #MyVoice
| 
| 0.49%
|-
| style="background-color:" |
| align="left" | Patricio Arenas
| colspan=2 align="left" | Citizens
| 
| 0.15%
|-
| style="background-color:" |
| align="left" | Palmira Pozo
| colspan=2 align="left" | Sans étiquette
| 
| 0.02%
|-
| style="background-color:" |
| align="left" | Alain Videau
| colspan=2 align="left" | Sans étiquette
| 
| 0.01%
|-
| colspan="8" style="background-color:#E9E9E9;"|
|- style="font-weight:bold"
| colspan="4" style="text-align:left;" | Total
| 
| 100%
| 
| 100%
|-
| colspan="8" style="background-color:#E9E9E9;"|
|-
| colspan="4" style="text-align:left;" | Registered voters
| 
| style="background-color:#E9E9E9;"|
| 
| style="background-color:#E9E9E9;"|
|-
| colspan="4" style="text-align:left;" | Blank ballots
| 
| 0.31%
| 
| 2.79%
|-
| colspan="4" style="text-align:left;" | Null ballots
| 
| 0.68%
| 
| 0.82%
|-
| colspan="4" style="text-align:left;" | Turnout
| 
| 15.48%
| 
| 12.47%
|-
| colspan="4" style="text-align:left;" | Abstentions
| 
| 84.52%
| 
| 87.53%
|}

2012

Candidates
The list of candidates was officially finalised on 14 May. There were twelve candidates:

The Union for a Popular Movement chose Pascal Drouhaud, formerly the party's director of international relations.

Europe Écologie–The Greens chose Sergio Coronado (born in Chile and raised in Argentina), with Cécile Lavergne as his deputy (suppléante). He was a spokesman for Eva Joly during the 2012 presidential election campaign. Coronado was endorsed by the Socialist Party, which did not presenting a candidate of its own.

Raquel Garrido, a member of the Left Party, was the chosen candidate for the Left Front, of which she was a co-founder and which also included the French Communist Party. A lawyer, she was described as "Jean-Luc Mélenchon's international spokeswoman". Born in Chile, she moved to France with her parents after the 1973 Chilean coup d'état. In France, she became a leader of the National Union of Students, then vice-president of SOS Racisme. She was also in charge of international relations at the Workers' Force union federation, and represented France at the International Labour Organization. Her deputy (suppléant) was singer-songwriter Nilda Fernández.

The National Front chose Alain-Gérard Georgi-Samaran, a resident of Paraguay who has been "an entrepreneur in South America for more than thirty years". Jean-Marie Matten was his deputy (suppléant).

The centre-right Radical Party and the centrist Republican, Ecologist and Social Alliance jointly chose Joel Doglioni, a resident of Bogota, as their candidate. Doglioni was an adviser to France's foreign trade. Jean-Jacques Gaudiot was his deputy (suppléant).

The centre-left Radical Party of the Left chose Thérèse Marianne-Pépin. Catherine Prost was her deputy (suppléante).

Solidarity and Progress, the French branch of the LaRouche movement, was represented by Cédric Manscour, with Silvia Santorio as his deputy (suppléante).

Françoise Lindemann, affiliated to the Union for a Popular Movement, ran as an independent candidate against the party's candidate. A resident of Brazil, she owned and ran a hotel outside Rio de Janeiro. Her deputy (suppléant) was Francis Javelly.

Charles-Henry Chenut, head of a law firm in Brazil, presented himself as an independent centrist candidate. His deputy was Emmanuel Henriet.

Palmira Pozo was an independent candidate. She proposed to allow her constituents to dictate her vote on every bill in Parliament. Francis Le Suave was her deputy.

Jean-Marc Millet was an independent candidate, representing his France Expat Collective Vision (Collectif Vision France Expat) movement. Philippe Gillier was his deputy.

Alain Terrien was an independent candidate, with Bertrang Lalague as his deputy.

Results
Turnout for the first round was low throughout the constituency, with a low point of 7% in Saint Lucia (where 34 of the 488 registered French citizens voted) and a high point of just 39.8% in El Salvador. Turnout was also comparatively high in Cuba (38.1%). Elsewhere, it was below 30%. The smallest turnout in numeric terms was in Suriname, where only 17 citizens voted, out of 148 (11.5%).

Sergio Coronado, the candidate of the Greens backed by the Socialist Party, obtained a comfortable lead in the first round. He finished first in almost every country (except the Dominican Republic, El Salvador, the Bahamas, Jamaica, Panama, Paraguay and Venezuela), and obtained 13 of the 17 votes cast in Suriname (76.47%). The electorate on the mainstream right was split between the UMP-endorsed candidate, Pascal Drouhaud, and dissident candidate Françoise Lindemann, who succeeded in obtaining over 16% of the vote to finish third. Raquel Garrido, the Left Front's international spokeswoman, obtained her party's joint best result abroad (fourth with 8.6%), matched by Juliette Estivil in the fifth constituency. Coronado went on to win the second round.

Presidential elections

2017 

|- style="background-color:#E9E9E9;text-align:center;"
! colspan="2" rowspan="2" style="text-align:left;" | Candidate
! rowspan="2" colspan="2" style="text-align:left;" | Party
! colspan="2" | 1st round
! colspan="2" | 2nd round
|- style="background-color:#E9E9E9;text-align:center;"
! width="75" | Votes
! width="30" | %
! width="75" | Votes
! width="30" | %
|-
| style="background-color:" |
| style="text-align:left;" | Emmanuel Macron
| style="text-align:left;" | En Marche!
| EM
| 
| 37.97%
| 
| 89.30%
|-
| style="background-color:" |
| style="text-align:left;" | François Fillon
| style="text-align:left;" | The Republicans
| LR
| 
| 26.28%
| colspan=2 rowspan=2 style="background-color:#E9E9E9;"|
|-
| style="background-color:" |
| style="text-align:left;" | Jean-Luc Mélenchon
| style="text-align:left;" | La France insoumise
| FI
| 
| 19.38%
|-
| style="background-color:" |
| style="text-align:left;" | Marine Le Pen
| style="text-align:left;" | National Front
| FN
| 
| 6.97%
| 
| 10.70%
|-
| style="background-color:" |
| style="text-align:left;" | Benoît Hamon
| style="text-align:left;" | Socialist Party
| PS
| 
| 5.98%
| colspan=2 rowspan=7 style="background-color:#E9E9E9;"|
|-
| style="background-color:#0b7d86" |
| align="left" | François Asselineau
| align="left" | Popular Republican Union
| UPR
| 
| 1.01%
|-
| style="background-color:" |
| style="text-align:left;" | Nicolas Dupont-Aignan
| style="text-align:left;" | Debout la France
| DLF
| 
| 0.90%
|-
| style="background-color:" |
| style="text-align:left;" | Philippe Poutou
| style="text-align:left;" | New Anticapitalist Party
| NPA
| 
| 0.63%
|-
| style="background-color:#FFA54C;" |
| align="left" | Jean Lassalle
| colspan=2 align="left" | Résistons!
| 
| 0.47%
|-
| style="background-color:" |
| style="text-align:left;" | Nathalie Arthaud
| style="text-align:left;" | Lutte Ouvrière
| LO
| 
| 0.21%
|-
| style="background-color:" |
| align="left" | Jacques Cheminade
| align="left" | Solidarity and Progress
| S&P
| 
| 0.19%
|-
| colspan="8" style="background-color:#E9E9E9;"|
|- style="font-weight:bold"
| colspan="4" style="text-align:left;" | Total
| 
| 100%
| 
| 100%
|}

References

2